HMS Berwick was a 70-gun third rate ship of the line of the Royal Navy, built at Chatham Dockyard during 1677/1679. After completion she was placed in Ordinary for 10 years. She was commissioned for the War of the English Succession 1689-1697, participating in the battles of Beachy Head and Barfleur. She was rebuilt between 1697 and 1700. She was commissioned for the War of Spanish Succession 1702-1712, participating in the battles of Vigo Bay, Capture of Gibraltar and Velez Malaga. placed in Ordinary in 1712, she was converted to a hulk at Portsmouth in 1715 before being broken in 1742.

This was the first vessel to bear the name Berwick in the English and Royal Navy.

HMS Berwick was awarded the Battle Honour Barfleur 1692 Vigo 1702, Gibraltar 1704, and Velez-Malaga 1704.

Construction and Specifications
She was ordered in April 1677 to be built at Chatham Dockyard under the guidance of Master Shipwright Phineas Pett. She was launched in May 1679. Her builder's measure tonnage was calculated as 1,041 tons (burthen).

Her initial gun armament was in accordance with the 1677 Establishment with 70/62 guns consisting of twenty-six demi-cannons (54 cwt, 9.5 ft) on the lower deck, twenty-four 12-pounder guns (32 cwt, 9 ft) on the upper deck, ten sakers (16 cwt, 7 ft) on the quarterdeck and four sakers (16 cwt, 7 ft) on the foc’x’le with four 3-pounder guns (5 cwt, 5 ft) on the poop deck or roundhouse. By 1688 she would carry 70 guns as per the 1685 Establishment . Her initial manning establishment would be for a crew of 460/380/300 personnel.

Commissioned Service

Service 1679 to 1700
She was commissioned in 1689 under the command of Captain Edward Stanley. Later in 1689 she was under command of Captain Henry Martin for the Battle of Beachy Head in Rear (Blue) Squadron on 30 June 1690. She fought in the Battle of Barfleur in Rear (Blue) Squadron, Centre Division from 19 to 22 May 1692. She also partook in the Battles off Cherbourg and La Hogue on 23 and 24 May 1692. She sailed with Russel's Fleet in the Mediterranean in October 1694. Captain Robert Sincock was in command in 1696 off Cape Clear. During 1697/98 she was Captain Lord Archibald Hamilton sailing with the Dunkirk Squadron. She would be rebuilt at Deptford in 1700.

Rebuild Deptford 1697-1700
She was ordered rebuilt (possibly) in November 1697 under contract by Edward Snelgrove of Deptford. She was launched/completed in May 1700. Her builder's measure tonnage was calculated as 1,090 tons (burthen). She probably retained her armament as stated in the 1685 Establishment, though it is unclear if her armament was changed to the 1703 Establishment later. It is known that when completed her gun armament total at least 70 guns.

Service 1701 to 1715
HMS Berwick was commissioned in 1701 under the command of Captain John Leake for service with Sir George Rooke's Fleet. In 1702 she came under Captain Richard Edwards remaining with Admiral Rooke's Fleet in Vice-Admiral (of the Red) Thomas Hopsonn's Squadron. The Fleet departed Portsmouth on 19 July 1702 for the Soundings at the Scilly Islands. Finally departing for Cadiz, Spain on the 22nd arriving at the Bay of Bulls, north of Cadiz on 8 August. After some success and much indecision on how to proceed the troops were withdrawn on 15 September and the Fleet departed by the 19th.

On 21 September it was learned from a watering expedition to Lagos, Portugal, that the Spanish Treasure Fleet and its French escort was in the vicinity of Vigo Bay. The Fleet sailed North to engage these vessels. After a council of War on 11 October, it was decided that only 25 vessels would be selected to attack the enemy vessels. She fought in the Battle of Vigo Bay  as a member White Squadron  under the command of Rear-Admiral Sir Stafford Fairborne  on 12 October. All enemy vessels were either taken or destroyed and much treasure was taken. The Fleet returned to England.

By September 1703 she was back in the Mediterranean with Sir George Rooke's Fleet. In 1704 she came under the command of Captain Robert Fairfax remaining with Rooke's Fleet. On 23 July 1704 she participated in the Capture of Gibraltar. She participated in the defense of Gibraltar at the Battle of Velez Malaga as a member of the Van Squadron on 13 August 1704. She suffered 23 killed with 24 wounded. In 1705 she came under the command of Captain Thomas Lisle until 1712. She remained in the Mediterranean 1706 thru 1707. She was at Alicante, Spain in July 1706. She was with Byng's Fleet at the Downs and North Sea during 1708-10. She went to Lisbon, Portugal in May 1710. Following this she escorted the Brazilian Fleet before returning to the Mediterranean in 1711. For 1711 thru 1712 she was in the English Channel. With the end of the War of Spanish Succession she was placed in Ordinary.

Disposition
In October 1715, she was fitted as a hulk at Portsmouth. She was finally broken at Portsmouth in August 1742.

Notes

Citations

References

 Lavery, Brian (2003) The Ship of the Line - Volume 1: The development of the battlefleet 1650-1850. Conway Maritime Press. .
 Colledge (2020), Ships of the Royal Navy, by J.J. Colledge, revised and updated by Lt Cdr Ben Warlow and Steve Bush, published by Seaforth Publishing, Barnsley, Great Britain, © 2020,  (EPUB), Section B (Berwick)
 Winfield (2009), British Warships in the Age of Sail (1603 – 1714), by Rif Winfield, published by Seaforth Publishing, England © 2009, EPUB 
 Thomas (1998), Battles and Honours of the Royal Navy, by David A. Thomas, first published in Great Britain by Leo Cooper 1998, Copyright © David A. Thomas 1998,  (EPUB)
 Clowes, William Laird (1898) The Royal Navy, A History from the Earliest Times to the Present (Vol. II). London. England: Sampson Low, Marston & Company, © 1898

Ships of the line of the Royal Navy
1670s ships